Uehrde is a municipality in the district of Wolfenbüttel, in Lower Saxony, Germany.

History 
It was first mentioned in 888 - then known as Urithi - when it was transferred from the monastery of Corvey to the ownership of Otto I, Duke of Saxony. The ducal fiefs went between 1255 and 1600 to the von Bortlfelt and the Vordorf families. Many families had estates or properties here, for example those of Amplebem, Hondelage, Strombeck, Weferlingen and Vordorf. The “Brunswick Cyriaksstift”, the Hospital Beatae Virginis, and the Aegidienkloster (a monastery of the Aegidian school of Augustinianism) had holdings in the village. A knightly family from this village has been known since 1204. As late as 1782 there were still remains of a keep and windmill built by Duke Julius of Brunswick-Lüneburg to be seen. These were traced back to 1584 and were still there around 1950.

Statistics 
On the 1st of March 1974 Uehrde was combined with the until then independent municipalities of Barnstorf, Warle and Watzum. 

The four districts and the number of inhabitants as of 1 March 2018:

References

Wolfenbüttel (district)